Zachary Stuart Littell (born October 5, 1995), nicknamed Lit, is an American professional baseball pitcher in the Texas Rangers organization. He was drafted by the Seattle Mariners in the 11th round of the 2013 Major League Baseball draft. He made his MLB debut in 2018 with the Minnesota Twins.

Early life
Littell attended Eastern Alamance High School in Mebane, North Carolina.

Professional career

Draft and minor leagues
Littell was drafted by the Seattle Mariners in the 11th round of the 2013 Major League Baseball draft. He signed with Seattle, forgoing his commitment to play college baseball at Appalachian State University. Littell made his professional debut with the Rookie-level Arizona League Mariners. He was 0–6 with a 5.94 ERA and a 1.560 WHIP in 33.1 innings in 2013. 

He pitched in 2014 for the Advanced Rookie League Pulaski Mariners, going 5–5 with a 4.52 ERA in 13 starts. Littell pitched in 2015 for the Class A Clinton LumberKings, compiling a 3–6 record and 3.91 ERA in 21 starts. 

He started 2016 with Clinton, and was promoted to the Bakersfield Blaze in July. In 28 total games (27 starts) between the two clubs, Littell collected a 13–6 record, 2.66 ERA, and 1.16 WHIP.

After the 2016 season, the Mariners traded Littell to the New York Yankees for pitcher James Pazos. Littell started 2017 with the Tampa Yankees and was promoted to the Trenton Thunder in late June.

On July 30, 2017, the Yankees traded Littell and pitcher Dietrich Enns to the Minnesota Twins in exchange for pitcher Jaime García and cash considerations. The Twins then assigned him to the Chattanooga Lookouts where he finished the season. In 27 total games (25 starts) between Tampa, Trenton, and Chattanooga, he went 19–1 with a 2.12 ERA and 1.12 WHIP. The Twins added him to their 40-man roster after the season.

Minnesota Twins (2018–2020)
Littell made his MLB debut on June 5, 2018. In 8 games in the majors in 2018, Littell went 0–2 with a 6.20 ERA, 14 K, and 11 BB in 20.1 innings. In the minors he was 6–9 with a 3.98 ERA.  

Littell moved to bullpen full time in 2019. He went 6–0 in 29 games with a 2.68 ERA, 32 K, and 9 BB in 37 innings, while in the minors in 63 innings he was 3–3 with a 3.71 ERA. He had a hard-hit rate of 52.5%.  In 2020 in 6.1 innings he gave up five home runs and  had a 9.95 ERA. 

On September 17, 2020, Littell was outrighted off of the 40-man roster. He became a free agent on November 2, 2020.

San Francisco Giants (2021–2022)
On February 3, 2021, Littell signed a minor league contract with the San Francisco Giants, and received an invitation to spring training.

In the 2021 regular season, Littell was 4–0 with a 2.92 ERA in 63 games (2 starts) covering 62.2 innings in which he struck out 63 batters with the Giants; with AAA Sacramento, he had a 9.00 ERA. His hard-hit percentage of 46.0% was in the bottom (worst) 5% of major league pitchers.

He was demoted to the Triple-A Sacramento River Cats on September 13, 2022, one day following an incident on the pitcher's mound with Giants manager Gabe Kapler which began with Littell slamming the ball into Kapler's hand as he was removed from a game, and angrily telling Kapler he wanted to remain in the game.

In 2022 he was 3–3 with a 5.08 ERA with the Giants. He was 0-1 with a 6.75 ERA with AAA Sacramento. The Giants waived him off the 40-man roster in November 2022; when no team chose to pick him up, the Giants outrighted him to Sacramento. He elected free agency on November 10, 2022.

Texas Rangers (2023–present)
On January 12, 2023, Littell signed a minor league contract with the Texas Rangers organization.

References

External links

1995 births
Living people
Baseball players from North Carolina
Major League Baseball pitchers
Minnesota Twins players
San Francisco Giants players
Arizona League Mariners players
Pulaski Mariners players
Clinton LumberKings players
Bakersfield Blaze players
Tampa Yankees players
Trenton Thunder players
Chattanooga Lookouts players
Rochester Red Wings players
People from Mebane, North Carolina